, or (with the definite article) , was a Cultural Federation of German Jews, established in 1933. It hired over 1300 men and 700 women artists, musicians, and actors fired from German institutions, and grew to about 70,000 members, according to some authors. Saul Friedländer speaks of at least 180,000.

History

1933–1937

Founded by Kurt Singer (1888-1944), the organization was originally named  (Cultural Federation of German Jews) in 1933, but in April 1935 the Nazi authorities – forcing the organisation to delete the term German from the name – imposed a change of the name into , i.e. The Nazis permitted this association to hide its oppression of Jews. The Kulturbund was one of the most famous examples of Jewish creativity in response to cultural exclusion. It provided a semblance of leisure for its 70,000 members in forty-nine different locals.

After the exclusion of Jewish Germans and gentile Germans of Jewish descent from participating in almost all organizations and public events, the  tried to provide some compensation, as tried Israelitisches Familienblatt.

The  put on theatrical performances, concerts, exhibitions, operas and lectures all over Germany, performed by Jewish entertainers, artists, writers, scientists etc., which were no longer permitted by the Nazi Party regime to appear before audiences. Thus, Jewish performers could again earn their livelihood, however scarce. The performances took place at authorized segregated venues with "Jewish only" attendance, meaning Jewish Germans and gentile Germans of Jewish descent and their eventually gentile spouses.

1938–1941

Following the Kristallnacht pogroms on November 9/10, 1938, the Kulturbund was allowed to continue its activities; however, the discrimination and persecution of Jews had driven many into impoverishment. The number of venues and of ensemble members was reduced.

On December 16 Hans Hinkel, State commissioner for Prussian theatre affairs including the Kulturbund, in Goebbels' Reich's Propaganda Ministry, declared in front of Dr. Werner Levie (1903–1945), a Dutchman and therefore one of the few available members – not in hiding or arrested – of Kulturbund's executive board, that until the end of December all the still existing 76 Jewish German publishing companies were to be shut down or sold to so-called Aryan owners. The few publications, which would still be permitted to appear, were to be directed by a publishing department to be formed within Kulturbund. In January 1939 the Kulturbund's publishing department opened in the offices formerly used by the Zionist Jüdische Rundschau, which had been shut down right after the Pogrom, with its former editor, Erich Liepmann, being the manager of the publishing department. The Kulturbund managed to save a great deal of the book stocks of the to-be-ceased publishing houses from being pulped. Levie reached the concession, that Jewish publishers obliged to liquidate their companies, might export their book stocks on their own until April 1939 if the respective purchasers would pay in foreign exchange to the Reichsbank. However, the publishers would be paid in inconvertible Reichsmarks only.

The Kulturbund's publishing department bought the remaining book stocks from their old proprietors at a discount of 80% to 95% of the original price and would only pay, once proceeds from sales abroad or to German or Austrian Jews and gentiles of Jewish descent would materialise. Also Austria, annexed by Germany in March 1938, was covered by the Kulturbund's publishing department.

The Propaganda Ministry only allowed the Kulturbund to continue to exist, if it would change its statutes to the effect that the minister (Goebbels) may – at any time – interfere in affairs of the executive board, even dissolve the Kulturbund and dispose of its assets. The changed statutes came into effect on 4 March 1939.

The Kulturbund's executive secretary Levie remigrated to the Netherlands at the end of August 1939. He was first succeeded by Johanna Marcus, who soon also emigrated and then by Willy Pless. The Kulturbund's performing activities nonetheless were embraced by the Jewish population who previously were barred from all cultural and entertainment events.

On September 11, 1941 the Gestapo ordered the closure of the Kulturbund, but excepted its publishing department, which was to be taken over by the Reichsvereinigung der Juden in Deutschland.

Fields of activity

Publishing
The Kulturbund's publishing department sold books from its stock to Jewish Germans and Austrians and thus created a surplus, which partly covered losses in the performing department. A considerable sum was transferred to the Central Office for Jewish Emigration, to pay emigration fees levied on lucky receivers of foreign visas, who, however, were too poor to pay them.

Music
The conductor Joseph Rosenstock led the opera department. The first opera was The Marriage of Figaro, 14 November 1933.

Theater 
The inaugural performance was of Gotthold Ephraim Lessing's Nathan the Wise on 1 October 1933 at the Berliner Theater on Charlottenstraße. Director Karl Loewenberg ends the play differently than Lessing's explicit stage directions, which direct the Jewish Nathan (played by actor Kurt Katsch), the Muslim Sultan Saladin, and the Christian Templar (played by Ernest Lenart) to embrace and exit festively together. Instead, Loewenberg leaves Nathan alone and isolated on the stage, with a pulpit and menorah visible.

Notes

External links

Jüdischer Kulturbund Leipzig: Monatsblätter, MF B1088 Digitized Library Periodical at the Leo Baeck Institute, New York 

Defunct Jewish organizations
Jewish Nazi German history
Kulturbund Deutscher Juden
German words and phrases
Kulturbund Deutscher Juden
1941 disestablishments in Germany
Organizations disestablished in 1941
Jewish organisations based in Germany